Paul James Miller (born 18 July 1966) is a radio presenter who resides in Twickenham, London.  He currently presents The Paul Miller Show on BBC Local Radio in the South of England.

Career 
Before his current run on the radio, Miller was offered a job at Channel 4's Big Breakfast, but turned down the offer because of his love for the radio.
Miller first appeared on BBC Radio Solent in 1994 as a traffic reporter on the station's morning slot.  A couple years later he was given his own show, broadcast on Saturday and Sunday nights, and was simulcast on BBC Southern Counties Radio from September 1997.

Since January 2000, he has hosted the late show from 10pm to 1am Monday to Thursday (and Friday until 2021).  The programme features quizzes, games and calls from listeners.  It is broadcast to six stations across the South of England:
 BBC Radio Solent
 BBC Radio Berkshire
 BBC Radio Kent
 BBC Radio Oxford
 BBC Radio Sussex
 BBC Radio Surrey
 BBC Sounds

The Paul Miller Soul Show

The Paul Miller Soul Show  was a primarily music based two hour show with occasional requests made by listeners.  It has not aired since 2021.

References

External links
Paul Miller (BBC Radio Solent)
Paul Miller Soul Show (BBC Radio Solent)

1966 births
Living people
People from Twickenham
English radio personalities